Blackall is a surname. Notable people with the surname include:

Clarence H. Blackall (1857–1942), American architect
Emily Lucas Blackall (1832–1892), American writer and philanthropist
Frederick Steele Blackall Jr. (1896–1963), American engineer
Graham Blackall, American blogger
Henry Blackall (1889–1981), Irish lawyer and judge
Jasper Blackall (born 1920), British sailor
John Blackall (1771–1860), English physician
Ofspring Blackall (1655–1716), English Anglican bishop and theologian
Samuel Blackall (1809–1871), Irish soldier and politician
Sophie Blackall, Australian artist and illustrator of children's books
William Blackall (1876–1941), Australian botanist